The 2013 Budapest Grand Prix was a women's tennis tournament played on outdoor clay courts. It was the 19th edition of the Budapest Grand Prix, an International-level tournament on the 2013 WTA Tour. It took place at the Római Tennis Academy in Budapest, Hungary, from 8 to 14 July 2013.  The organisers decided to hold the tournament despite the recent floods in Hungary, but canceled the qualifying rounds (the top four alternates entered the main draw automatically) and reduced the doubles draw from 16 teams to eight.

Singles main draw entrants

Seeds 

 1 Rankings are as of 24 June 2013

Other entrants 
The following players received wildcards into the singles main draw:
  Ágnes Bukta
  Réka-Luca Jani
  Vanda Lukács

The following players received entry from the alternates list (qualifying was canceled to allow courts to recover from recent flooding):
  Aleksandra Krunić
  Tadeja Majerič
  Shahar Pe'er 
  Valeria Solovyeva

Withdrawals 
Before the tournament
  Jana Čepelová
  Melinda Czink
  Eleni Daniilidou
  Kaia Kanepi
  Romina Oprandi
  Tsvetana Pironkova
  Carla Suárez Navarro

Retirements
  Andrea Hlaváčková

Doubles main draw entrants

Seeds 

1 Rankings are as of 24 June 2013

Other entrants 
The following pairs received wildcards into the doubles main draw:
  Lilla Barzó /  Dalma Gálfi
  Ágnes Bukta /  Réka-Luca Jani

Finals

Singles 

  Simona Halep defeated  Yvonne Meusburger 6–3, 6–7(7–9), 6–1

Doubles 

  Andrea Hlaváčková /  Lucie Hradecká defeated  Nina Bratchikova /  Anna Tatishvili, 6–4, 6–1

References

External links 
 

Budapest Grand Prix
Budapest Grand Prix
Buda
Buda